Acacia arafurica is a shrub belonging to the subgenus Phyllodineae of the genus Acacia in the family Fabaceae. It is endemic to the Northern Territory, Australia.

Description
Acacia arafurica is a shrub or tree growing up to 4 m high, with terete branchlets, which are sparsely to densely pubescent. The phyllodes are asymmetrically ovate to rhomboidal. It blooms between April and July producing flower-spikes that occur singly or in pairs. After flowering linear, straight seed pods form that resemble a string of beads.

Acacia arafurica is distinguished from A. sublanata by its thicker and larger phyllodes, its longer peduncles, and its inflorescences arranged in the form of a spike (spicate).

Taxonomy
The species was first formally described by the botanists Mary Tindale and Phillip Kodela in 1992 as part of the work New species of Acacia (Fabaceae, Mimosoideae) from tropical Australia as published in the journal Telpoea. It was reclassified as Racosperma arafuricum by Leslie Pedley in 2003 and transferred back to genus Acacia in 2006.

Distribution and habitat
It is found from the northern part of Arnhem Land to the Cobourg Peninsula in the Northern Territory, growing in sand in swampy areas on coastal river flats or near streams in the gorge country, or sometimes in open forest.

Etymology
The specific epithet, arafurica, refers to the Arafura Sea which lies to the north of where A. arafurica is found.

See also
List of Acacia species

References

External links
Acacia arafurica World Wide Wattle

arafurica
Endemic flora of Australia
Flora of the Northern Territory
Plants described in 1992
Taxa named by Mary Tindale